BIRDEM, the Bangladesh Institute of Research and Rehabilitation in Diabetes, Endocrine and Metabolic Disorders at Shahbag, Dhaka, Bangladesh, is a 600-bed multidisciplinary hospital complex of the Diabetic Association of Bangladesh. The hospital was established in 1980 with the financial support of Bangladesh. In BIRDEM, 3,000 patients are treated in the Out Patients Department (OPD) every day. No other hospital in Bangladesh serves so many diabetes patients.

History
The Diabetic Association for Pakistan (later Bangladesh Diabetic Association) was formed under the leadership of national professor Muhammad Ibrahim in February 1956. He offered a ground floor room of his home in Segunbagicha, Dhaka, to be used by the association, and there he began outpatient services for diabetes. While Bangladesh was still part of Pakistan, the government granted the association land in Segunbagicha for a hospital. BIRDEM hospital was inaugurated in 1980 at Shahbagh. In 2013, BIRDEM-2 hospital was started in Segunbagicha.

Awards
 Independence Day Award, 1983
 Ibne Sina Award, 2004
 Metropolitan Chamber of Commerce Industry award, 2014

References

External links

 
 Diabetic Association of Bangladesh

Medical research institutes in Bangladesh
Buildings and structures in Dhaka
Hospitals established in 1980
Diabetes organizations
Recipients of the Independence Day Award
Endocrinology organizations
Hospitals in Dhaka
1980 establishments in Bangladesh